The Ecologic Association Green Osijek was founded in 1995 in Osijek, Croatia.

Its main activities are environmental protection, schools in nature, ecotourism and preserving the cultural and natural heritage of Slavonia and Baranja region. The main project of Green Osijek is development of Eco centre Zlatna Greda near the Nature park Kopački rit. In Eco centre Zlatna Greda, the association is organising schools in nature, hiking through wetlands and forests, boat rides on the Danube, birdwatching, making of traditional meals in the open fire under the gazebo.

External links
Zeleni Osijek 
Zlatna Greda 

Osijek
Environmental organizations based in Croatia
1995 establishments in Croatia